Khaled Achour (born 11 August 1955) is a Tunisian handball player. He competed in the 1976 Summer Olympics.

References

1955 births
Living people
Handball players at the 1976 Summer Olympics
Tunisian male handball players
Olympic handball players of Tunisia